Lakewood Playhouse is a theatre in Lakewood, Washington.

History
Lakewood Playhouse was founded in 1938.  They currently have a 180-seat theatre in the Tacoma area, at the Lakewood Towne Center.

External links
Official Website

References

Buildings and structures in Pierce County, Washington
Theatre companies in Washington (state)
Theatres in Washington (state)
Lakewood, Washington